Estrela Velha is a municipality in the state of Rio Grande do Sul, Brazil. It was raised to municipality status in 1995, the area being taken out of the municipality of Arroio do Tigre.

The municipality is partly flooded by the reservoir of the Dona Francisca Hydroelectric Plant on the upper Jacuí River.

See also
List of municipalities in Rio Grande do Sul

References

Municipalities in Rio Grande do Sul